The Fiat Palio is a supermini car released by the Italian manufacturer Fiat in April 1996. It was produced until 2018.

The Palio is a world car and was developed by Fiat Automóveis with an aim at developing countries. It has been produced in various countries worldwide, and its platform was also used in the Siena sedan, the Palio Weekend station wagon, the Palio Adventure crossover and the Strada light pick-up truck.

Origins of the Palio badge
The Palio badge originated on the European-market Mark II Fiat 127, of 1977, where it was a trim designation rather than an actual model. The 127 Palio featured alloy wheels, a more luxurious interior, and a metallic paint finish as found on the 127 Sport. The Palio designation was also used on other Fiat models throughout the 1980s and 1990s in various markets.

First generation (178, 1996)

1996–2002 (Phase I)

Launched in 1996 in Brazil, as part of Fiat's "Project 178", the Palio was Fiat's first attempt to build a world car, the same basic design produced in numerous nations around the globe. Four principal models were produced: hatchback, sedan, pickup, and station wagon, with different versions built for different markets. The powerplants, both diesel and petrol, also varied from region to region depending on local production capability, legislation, and market requirements.

The basic chassis was a development of the European Fiat Uno but little remained unchanged. The entire structure was significantly stronger to be suitable on the rougher roads found in some of the markets for which it was intended. The suspension layout, as on the Uno, consisted of MacPherson struts at the front and a torsion beam at the rear, even though the Weekend (station wagon) version had the fully independent trailing arms rear end from the Fiat Punto instead. The body was a completely new design by the I.DE.A Institute of Turin, which also designed the new interior. Some engines were also coming from other Fiat models, such as the Punto and the Bravo.

Production began in 1996 in Brazil and was followed later that year by a plant in Argentina. In 1997,  production started in Venezuela, Poland for the European market, and Morocco (at the Somaca plant) whilst Turkey started building the same car in 1998. In India, assembly was at Pune in the new Fiat-Tata Motors factory and in South Africa  by Nissan together the pickup version called Fiat Strada. Production in India and South Africa began in 1999, in Egypt in 2001, and in China in 2002. The Palio Weekend station wagon was launched in 1996 in Brazil and later in Europe. The station wagon is the version most commonly sold in Europe.

2001–2006 (Phase II)

In 2001, the model had its first facelift. The new design was manufactured by the Italian automobile designer Giorgetto Giugiaro. This facelift included new front and rear fasciae and a brand new interior. Also, new engines came for the Palio: the Fire 16-valve 1.0-L and 1.2-L and the Sporting, a 1.6-L 16-valve engine with 120 hp made in Turkey. The 2001 Palio was the first Fiat to be made in China, by Nanjing Automobile. In some markets, this generation included a Speedgear CVT option. The Palio 2001 facelift is the ultimate version sold in Italy. In 2001, Fiat introduced for the South American market the crossover version, called Palio Adventure and based on the Palio Weekend. In Europe, the Palio Weekend was succeeded in 2003 by the Fiat Idea MPV.

Nanjing Fiat Palio
In November 2001, the Chinese Fiat Palio debuted, with either the  1.2-L or the  1.5-L. The Siena sedan was added in November 2002, followed by the Palio Weekend in June 2003. The Palio Weekend were not available with the smaller engine. A 1.6-L 72kW weekend was planned but never been sold.

Safety rating
A Fiat Albea, the sedan version of the Palio, was tested in Russia according to the Euro NCAP latest standard (offset frontal crash at 64 km/h). The Albea scored 8,5 points in the frontal test, equivalent to three stars. The tested vehicle was equipped with standard driver airbag and regular seatbelts.

The Fiat Perla, the Chinese version of the Albea, was tested in China by China-NCAP in three different tests: 100% front crash test with a wall (similar to the U.S. National Highway Traffic Safety Administration test), a 40% offset test (similar to Euro NCAP), and a side crash test. The Perla scored 8.06 points in the 100% frontal crash test, equivalent to three stars; 12.02 pts in the 40% offset crash test, equivalent to four stars, and 10,96 pts in the side crash test, equivalent to three stars; with an average result of 31 points and three stars. The tested vehicle was equipped with standard driver and passenger airbags and regular seatbelts.

2004–2016 (Phase III)

The second revision was released in 2004, designed again by Giorgetto Giugiaro. It is basically a facelift from the previous models. The 2004 Palio was the first Brazilian model in the B-segment available with four airbags (two front airbags and two side airbags), parking assistance, and light and rain sensor. In Europe, the new model featured a redesigned front fascia and interior with rear fascia similar to Palio 2001 version. It has also a sport version called the Palio 1.8R' which has a new version of the General Motors 1.8-L X18XE Powertrain engine rated at 115 hp (ethanol) and 112 hp (gasoline), lowered suspension, new 14-inch alloy wheels, new seats, and other sporting features. The third generation of the Palio had huge sales numbers, even getting higher sales in some months than the VW Gol, the Brazilian best-selling car for over 24 years. It is currently sold as the Palio Fire Economy as a cheaper alternative to its posterior facelift, with alterations derived from the Uno Mille Fire Economy model. The top model is still Weekend Adventure version; it is equipped with a 1.8-L Powertrain Flex fuel engine with 112 hp (petrol/gasoline) and 114 hp (ethanol) at 5500 rpm, all-terrain Pirelli Citynet tires, and a higher/reinforced suspension kit but still with 4x2 drive.

Fiat India is manufacturing the 2004 Palio, with 2001-version interiors, at the Ranjangaon plant along with the Grande Punto and Linea. After entering into a partnership with Tata Motors, the Palio has been relaunched as the Palio Stile, with the 1.1-L Fire, 1.6-L Torque, and 1.3-L Multijet engines. Sales have been low at hardly 200 units per month.

2007–2011 (Phase IV)

The last Palio facelift was launched in 2007, in Natal, Brazil. The design of the body was inspired by the new version of the Grande Punto, which was launched in Brazil in the first quarter of 2008.

This fourth facelift included a new front, rear, and side designs, but it kept the original chassis from the 1996 model, being marketed as the New Palio. It also has a minor change in the instrument panel with differences between the two variants sold.

The trims for this new Palio are ELX with the 1.0- or the 1.4-L Fire engines, both flex (ethanol and petrol) and the "sporty"  version 1.8R with the current revision of the 1.8-L 8-valve engine from GM, also flexible. The new Torque engines were added to the Palio after the launch of the Grande Punto. The Palio Adventure introduced the new limited slip differential and new suspension for off-road with front-wheel drive.

In 2011, after buying the Brazilian factory and the project of the Tritec engine, Fiat modified it and launched its new line of 4 cylinder engines (E-Torq) in South America, being the 1.6 16V (114 HP) equipping all the family, and the 1.75 (sold as 1.8, 130 HP) equipping the Strada and Palio Weekend.

In 2012 Palio and its LWB-sedan variant, Albea has been discontinued in Tofaş plant.

In 2015 the station-wagon variant has been renamed as Fiat Weekend, dropping the Palio name.

Second generation (326, 2011)

An all-new generation of Palio was revealed in October 2011, at the annual Fiat dealers' meeting in Mykonos, Greece. The official launch, however, took place on 4 November 2011, in Brazil. It is the first total remodeling since launch in 1996. The project, code named 326, was anticipated by the success of the new Fiat Uno in Brazil. One of the new versions will be the Sporting, a trim level known for the sporty versions of the Siena, Uno, Idea, Bravo, and Strada. In late 2017, the Fiat Palio assembly line stopped in Argentina, due to Fiat's plans to start assembling the new Fiat Cronos, the saloon version of Fiat Argo, as well as a basic version of Argo without the Chrysler UConnect multimedia system, making the Palio officially discontinued worldwide after 21 years.

Electric version
In 2007, Fiat joined Brazilian utility companies Cemig and Itaipu to develop new electric vehicles for Brazil.  The Palio electric conversions were manufactured in small numbers with only limited production, with an initial batch of converted Fiat Palio cars scheduled to start testing in late 2007. After three years in development, the Palio Weekend entered production at Fiat's Foz do Iguazu factory in Brazil.

Motorsport
Several competition and homologated versions of the Palio have been produced, such as the A6 class rally car, multiple Brazilian and South American champion of the A6 class with Brazilian Luis Tedesco as the driver, and the Turkish Fiat Rally Team-created Palio Super 1600 Abarth rally car, with a 215-hp 1.6-L 16-valve engine and a six-speed sequential transmission. Turkey also boasts an N2 Palio.

Safety
The first generation design of Fiat Palio, that had very few structural changes from 1997, has been rated as highly unsafe by Latin NCAP in its most basic Latin American configuration  with no airbags in 2010, scoring only one star for adult occupants and two stars for children. Its airbag-equipped version scored three stars in 2011, although it is a vast minority in the sales mix. This changed with the Brazilian law requiring dual front airbags from 2014 on.

The New Palio with no airbags and no ABS received 0 stars for adult occupants and 2 stars for toddlers from Latin NCAP in 2014.

The New Palio with 2 airbags received 3 stars for adult occupants and 2 stars for toddlers from Latin NCAP in 2014.

The updated New Palio with 2 airbags received 4 stars for adult occupants and 3 stars for toddlers from Latin NCAP in 2015.

The New Palio with 2 airbags and no ESC received 1 star for adult occupants and 3 stars for toddlers from Latin NCAP in 2016 (one level above 2010-2015).

Sales

See also
Fiat Siena
Fiat Strada

References

External links

Official Fiat Palio website

Palio
Front-wheel-drive vehicles
Subcompact cars
Pickup trucks
Hatchbacks
Sedans
Station wagons
Cars of Brazil
Cars of China
2000s cars
2010s cars
Cars introduced in 1996
Flexible-fuel vehicles
Cars of Turkey
Cars of India
Cars of Argentina
Latin NCAP superminis